The 2021 UCI MTB Season was the sixthteeth season of the UCI MTB Season. The 2021 season began on 12 February with the Trek Israel Series no. 1 in Israel and ended in November 2021.

Events

February

March

April

May

June

July

August

September

October

November

December

2020 Summer Olympics

2021 Junior Pan American Games

2021 UCI Mountain Bike World Cup

National Championships

Continental and World Championships

References

UCI Mountain Bike World Cup